Robert Hunter Coleman (September 26, 1890 – July 16, 1959) was an American catcher, coach and manager in Major League Baseball. He also was one of the most successful managers in the history of minor league baseball. During a career that extended (with interruptions caused by Major League service) from 1919 through 1957, he won ten regular season pennants and five league titles.  He won his first pennant with the 1922 Terre Haute Tots of the Three-I League, and he also won a championship with the 1935 Springfield Senators, also of the Three-I League.  The rest of his titles came with the Evansville, Indiana, franchises in the Three-I League.

Early life and career
A native of Huntingburg, Indiana, Coleman played just three seasons in the Major Leagues, with the Pittsburgh Pirates (1913–14) and the Cleveland Indians (1916). The New York Times took notice of the fact that Coleman "accepted 13 chances on the 13th day of June in the year 1913" during a 3–2 loss to the New York Giants. The right-handed-hitting catcher batted .241 with 55 hits and one home run in 116 total games.

In 1919, at age 28, he embarked on his managerial career with the Mobile Bears of the Class A Southern Association. By 1926 he was a coach for the Boston Red Sox, but the following season he returned to the minor leagues, and in 1928 he became manager of the Evansville Hubs of the Class B Three-I League, where he would spend much of the rest of his baseball career. He managed Evansville for 20 seasons over four separate tours of duty (1928–31; 1938–42; 1946–49; 1951–57), and won eight pennants there (1930, 1938, 1941, 1949, 1952, 1954, 1956 and 1957) including his final season.

Coleman made it back to the Majors as a coach with the Detroit Tigers in 1932, and the Boston Braves in 1943. During the 1943 season, his boss, manager Casey Stengel, suffered a broken leg when he was hit by a taxicab as he tried to cross a Boston street on April 20. Coleman stepped in for 46 games, through June 17, while Stengel recovered (the Braves winning 21). At season's end, Stengel was fired and Coleman was named permanent manager of the Braves for 1944. But the wartime Braves were not contenders and after a sixth-place 1944 finish was followed by a sluggish start to 1945, Coleman was replaced by one of his coaches, Del Bissonette, on July 29. His final record as a Major League manager was 128–165 (.437).

He then returned to Evansville as manager of the Evansville Braves, a Boston farm team, and resumed his minor league career. In 35 seasons as a minor league skipper, Coleman's teams won 2,496 games and lost 2,103 (.543).

He died in Boston at age 68 from cancer in 1959.

References

Lloyd Johnson, ed., The Minor League Register. Durham, North Carolina: Baseball America, 1994.

Further reading
 Jurgens, Jerry (July 18, 1959). "Sport-o-Scope: Tribute to Bob Coleman". Quad-City Times. p. 10.
 Swick, "On the Rebound". Galesburg Register-Mail. p. 10.

External links

Obituary

1890 births
1959 deaths
Baseball coaches from Indiana
Baseball players from Indiana
Boston Braves coaches
Boston Braves managers
Boston Red Sox coaches
Cleveland Indians players
Columbus Senators players
Davenport Blue Sox players
Davenport Prodigals players
Deaths from cancer in Massachusetts
Detroit Tigers coaches
Knoxville Smokies players
Major League Baseball catchers
Milwaukee Braves scouts
Milwaukee Brewers (minor league) managers
Minneapolis Millers (baseball) players
Mobile Bears players
People from Huntingburg, Indiana
Pittsburgh Pirates players
St. Paul Saints (AA) managers
San Antonio Bears players
San Antonio Missions managers
Sportspeople from Evansville, Indiana
Springfield Senators players
Terre Haute Tots players